Weather Wars may refer to:

Weather wars, a description of sensationalist journalism
North Atlantic weather war, during World War II

See also
Weather warfare
Weather warning